Matthew Ryan vs. The Silver State (or MRVSS) is an album by Matthew Ryan, released in 2008 on 00:02:59 and One Little Indian.  Following the release of the album, Ryan toured the US to support its release with a full band.

Track listing
All songs written by Matthew Ryan

"Dulce et Decorum est" — 7.01
"American Dirt" — 4.32
"Meet Me By The River" — 4.47
"It Could’ve Been Worse" — 5.44
"Hold On Firefly" — 2.36
"Jane, I Still Feel The Same" — 3.50
"Killing The Ghost" — 4.01
"They Were Wrong" — 4.14
"I Only Want To Be The Man You Want" — 4.19
"Drunk And Disappointed" — 4.31
"Closing In" — 4.41

Exclusive Internet-only downloads of the album also included the song "Rainy Night in Soho" following "Closing In"

Personnel
Brian Bequette - Guitar, Slide, Feedback, Bass and Piano
Doug Lancio - Bass, Electric Guitar, Pog, Resonator, Mandolin, Slide, Piano and Feedback
Steve Lantanation - drums, percussion and backing vocals
Matthew Ryan - Acoustic Guitar, Electric Guitar, Pog, Piano, synth and Vocals

2008 albums
Matthew Ryan (musician) albums
One Little Independent Records albums